The women's 100 metres event at the 1994 Commonwealth Games was held on 22 and 23 August at the Centennial Stadium in Victoria, British Columbia.

Medalists

Results

Heats

Wind:Heat 1: +1.3 m/s, Heat 2: +0.9 m/s, Heat 3: +0.5 m/s, Heat 4: +0.2 m/s

Semifinals

Wind:Heat 1: +1.2 m/s, Heat 2: +1.5 m/s

Final
Wind: -0.2 m/s

References

100
1994
1994 in women's athletics